Filip Kuba (born December 29, 1976) is a Czech former professional ice hockey defenseman. Kuba most recently played for the Florida Panthers of the National Hockey League (NHL). He has previously played for the Minnesota Wild, Tampa Bay Lightning, and the Ottawa Senators of the NHL.

Playing career
Kuba was drafted in the 1995 NHL Entry Draft by the Florida Panthers in the 8th round, 192nd overall, after playing with HC Vítkovice junior team in his native Czech Republic.  Upon being drafted, he remained in the Czech Republic for one more season, playing with HC Vítkovice's senior team of the Czech Extraliga.

Moving to North America, he played the majority of his four seasons with the Panthers in the minor leagues before being traded to the Calgary Flames for Rocky Thompson on March 16, 2000. Before the 2000–01 season began, Kuba was left unprotected by the Flames for the 2000 NHL Expansion Draft and was claimed by the Minnesota Wild.

He played his first full NHL season with the Wild in the subsequent season and recorded 9 goals and 30 points. In 2003, the Wild advanced to the playoff semifinals, defeating division rivals Colorado Avalanche and Vancouver Canucks before falling to the Mighty Ducks of Anaheim in four games. Kuba set career playoff marks, appearing in 18 games and scoring 8 points during Minnesota's run. After five seasons with the Wild, he became an unrestricted free agent and on July 1, 2006, he signed with the Tampa Bay Lightning. He left the Wild as the franchise's all-time leader in scoring among defensemen with 33 goals and 132 points in 357 games.  During his time with Minnesota, he was named team captain on two occasions, in November 2001 and November 2005, as part of the Wild's monthly rotating captaincy system.  Kuba represented the Wild along with teammate Dwayne Roloson in the 2004 All-Star game.

In 2006–07, his first season with Tampa Bay, he recorded a career-high 15 goals, 22 assists and 37 points.  On August 29, 2008, Kuba was traded to the Ottawa Senators, along with Alexandre Picard and San Jose's first-round draft pick for defenseman Andrej Meszaros.

With Ottawa, Kuba broke an NHL record for defensemen with an assist on October 25, 2008, against the Toronto Maple Leafs, giving him at least one point in each of the team's first eight games of the season. The previous best was set in 1981–82 by Brad Park, who recorded a point in each of the Boston Bruins' first seven games.

On July 1, 2012, Kuba returned to his original draft team, the Florida Panthers, signing a two-year contract worth $8 million. In the lockout-shortened 2012–13 season, Kuba was unable to live up to his contract registering 10 points in 44 games for the cellar-dwelling Panthers. On July 3, 2013, Kuba was bought out from the remaining year of his deal with the Panthers.

International play
Kuba played his first game for the national team in 2001, and has played 30 times for the Czech national team (as of Jan 3 2009)

Played for the Czech Republic in:
2001 World Championships (gold)
2002 World Championships
2006 Winter Olympics (bronze)
2008 World Championships
2010 Czech Republic Olympic hockey team

Career statistics

Regular season and playoffs

International

References

External links
 

1976 births
Living people
Beast of New Haven players
Carolina Monarchs players
Czech expatriate ice hockey people
Czech expatriate ice hockey players in Canada
Czech expatriate ice hockey players in the United States
Czech ice hockey defencemen
Florida Panthers players
Florida Panthers draft picks
HC Vítkovice players
Houston Aeros (1994–2013) players
Ice hockey players at the 2006 Winter Olympics
Ice hockey players at the 2010 Winter Olympics
Kentucky Thoroughblades players
Medalists at the 2006 Winter Olympics
Minnesota Wild players
National Hockey League All-Stars
Olympic bronze medalists for the Czech Republic
Olympic ice hockey players of the Czech Republic
Olympic medalists in ice hockey
Ottawa Senators players
Sportspeople from Ostrava
Tampa Bay Lightning players